Courage the Cowardly Dog is an American animated comedy horror television series created by John R. Dilworth for Cartoon Network and distributed by Warner Bros. Domestic Television. It was produced by Dilworth's animation studio, Stretch Films, and originally aired from 1999 to 2002. The title character is a dog who lives with an elderly couple in a farmhouse in the middle of "Nowhere". In each episode, the trio is thrown into bizarre, frequently disturbing, and often paranormal or supernatural adventures. The series is known for its dark, surreal humor and atmosphere.

Dilworth pitched the series to Hanna-Barbera's animated shorts showcase What a Cartoon! and a pilot titled "The Chicken from Outer Space" aired on Cartoon Network on February 18, 1996. The segment was nominated for an Academy Award, but lost to the Wallace and Gromit short film A Close Shave. The short was greenlit to become a series, which premiered on November 12, 1999, and ended on November 22, 2002, with 4 seasons each consisting of 13 episodes. During its run, the series received critical acclaim and over the years, has developed a strong cult following. It was also nominated for three Golden Reel Awards and won one Annie Award.

Premise 

Courage the Cowardly Dog follows Courage (Marty Grabstein), a kind yet easily frightened troublesome  dog. He was abandoned as a puppy after his parents were sent into outer space by a crazed veterinarian. Soon after, he was found in an alleyway by Muriel Bagge (Thea White), a friendly Scottish woman who decided to take Courage in as her own, and was inspired by the nature of this first meeting to give him his name. In the present, he lives with the now elderly Muriel and her husband Eustace Bagge (Lionel Wilson in episodes 1–33, Arthur Anderson in episodes 34–52), a grumpy and greedy American man who regularly mistreats Courage out of jealousy and refers to him as "stupid dog", and frequently scares him with a mask in an isolated farmhouse: the nearest town to the farmhouse is a town called Nowhere.

Courage and his owners frequently encounter monsters, aliens, zombies, and other paranormal or supernatural creatures that are attracted to Nowhere. The plot generally uses conventions common to horror films. Although most of the creatures the three face are hostile, some only appear that way, but are simply suffering from distress, anger, and/or acting in desperation, and sometimes because they are depressed, but they can turn out to be friendly to them.

The task of protecting Muriel and Eustace from such dangers falls on Courage, who endeavors to thwart or reconcile with the monster of the week and remedy or repair any damages done. Although Courage is occasionally aided with that task, the full extent of his efforts is usually performed unbeknownst to Muriel and Eustace. Ironically, given his name, Courage may be considered a genuine hero who often goes to great lengths to protect his owners, and a genuine coward who still expresses much of his distress with over-the-top, piercing shrieks.

Although episodic in nature, there are a handful of recurring characters in the show's cast, including Courage's sarcastic, sentient computer (Simon Prebble); the family physician Dr. Vindaloo (Paul Schoeffler); a fortune-telling chihuahua named Shirley the Medium (Mary Testa); Eustace's mother "Ma" (Billie Lou Watt); villains Katz and Le Quack (both voiced by Schoeffler), and the antagonistic Di Lung.

Production

Creation 

Originally, Courage the Cowardly Dog was created as a seven-minute animated short, "The Chicken from Outer Space". Dilworth started the animated short with Hanna-Barbera, sponsored by Cartoon Network and introduced Courage. Dilworth graduated with a Bachelor of Fine Arts from the School of Visual Arts in New York in 1985. He became an art director and founded his own animation studio, Stretch Films in 1991, and incorporated in 1994. The character of Courage grew out of an earlier character of Dilworth's called Hamilton, who appeared in Smart Talk with Raisin, a pilot Dilworth created for MTV.

The animated short was shown as one of the episodes of Cartoon Network's World Premiere Toons in 1996, a Hanna-Barbera Cartoons innovation by then-president Fred Seibert. The short served as a de facto pilot for the future series. The original animated short had no dialogue except for one line spoken by Courage, who had a more authoritative voice akin to Jackie Mason than in the series. It was uttered by voice actor Howard Hoffman who also provided all the other vocal sounds and effects for the short. An alien chicken was the villain in this short, who later reappears in the series to seek revenge. His sons also attempt to seek revenge in a later episode. The short was nominated for the Academy Award for Best Animated Short Film at the 68th Academy Awards, but lost to the Wallace and Gromit short film A Close Shave.

Sound design 
When deciding on sound effects, Dilworth tried to avoid pre-made stock sounds. He contributed a substantial amount of new material to sound designer Michael Geisler and only looked for sounds that made him laugh. The composition of the series' music relied on what was being portrayed: suspense, comedy, or action. The production crew worked together to come up with new music for the series that had not previously been used. There were a few sections on one particular piece that Dilworth exceptionally liked. The production crew was able to isolate these sections and expand them into a usable theme.

Original music featured in Courage the Cowardly Dog was composed by Jody Gray and Andy Ezrin. Classical music can be heard at times, which pays homage to classic Warner Bros. animation and the scores of Carl Stalling. In several episodes, Gray arranged various famous classical pieces, such as Wagner's "Ride of the Valkyries", and wrote up to 15 songs.

Broadcast history 
Courage the Cowardly Dog originally was premiered as a short on February 18, 1996. The show premiered on November 12, 1999, and became the highest-rated premiere in Cartoon Network history at the time. It last aired on November 22, 2002, with 52 episodes produced in four seasons.

Episodes 

In total, there were 52 episodes in four seasons produced, plus a pilot episode and a special episode. The series ran from November 12, 1999, to November 22, 2002.

Reception 
John G. Nettles of PopMatters reviewed the show and called it, "a fascinating and textured mixture of cartoon and horror-movie conventions, and a joy to watch."

Alex Mastas of Lights Out Films reviewed the show gave it a grade "A−" and described it: "The backgrounds are rich and imaginative—they composite a lot of the show over real photos and occasionally integrate CGI into the cartoon. The look is weird and ethereal, just like the show itself."

KJ Dell Antonia of Common Sense Media gave three stars out of five with the summary, "Cult fave 'toon plays over-the-top violence for laughs." Antonia warned parents that the series contains graphic animated violence, including "exploding organs, growing extra limbs, turning inside out, you name it". Randy Miller III of DVD Talk said that shows aimed at younger audiences "usually don't go for thrills and chills, so it's good to see a genuinely surreal and slanted series develop a decent following."

Jeff Swindoll of Monsters and Critics reviewed the first season DVD and felt a bit disappointed about its lack of the original Hanna-Barbera short The Chicken from Outer Space. Swindoll felt that the lack of special features should still not deter fans from buying the season since the other episodes have only appeared piecemeal on other releases of the series.

Awards and nominations 

|-
! style="background:#bfd7ff;" colspan="4"|Academy Awards
|-
| 1995
| John R. DilworthFor short film "The Chicken from Outer Space" 
| Best Animated Short Film
| 
|-
! style="background:#bfd7ff;" colspan="4"|Annie Awards
|-
| 2000
| John R. DilworthFor episode "A Night at the Katz Motel"
| Outstanding Individual Achievement for Production Design in an Animated Television Production
| 
|-
! style="background:#bfd7ff;" colspan="4"|Golden Reel Awards
|-
| 2000
| For episode "The Duck Brothers"
| Best Sound Editing—Television Animated Series—Sound
| 
|-
| 2001
| For episode "Courage in the Big Stinkin' City"
| Best Sound Editing—Television Animated Series—Sound
| 
|-
| 2003
| For episode "The Tower of Dr. Zalost"
| Best Sound Editing—Television Animated Series—Sound
| 
|}

Merchandise

Home media 
VHS editions of Scooby-Doo! and the Witch's Ghost and Scooby-Doo and the Alien Invaders each include an episode of Courage the Cowardly Dog as a bonus.

Courage the Cowardly Dog: Season One, a two-disc DVD set featuring all 13 episodes from the show's first season, was released in Australia (Region 4) on September 12, 2007, by Madman Entertainment. On January 13, 2010, the complete second season was also released.

A Region 1 release of the first season was done by Warner Home Video (via Warner Archive) on July 20, 2010. The release is the second in an official release of several Cartoon Cartoons on DVD, under the "Cartoon Network Hall of Fame" name. The second season was released on October 14, 2014 as the fourth in the "Hall of Fame" series. The third season was originally supposed to be released on DVD in Region 1 on February 2, 2016, but it was delayed to (and was released on) March 22, 2016. It is the fifth title in the Cartoon Network Hall of Fame series. The fourth and final season was released on September 27, 2016. Courage  is one of the few Cartoon Network shows to be available in its entirety on DVD.

In addition, all four seasons of the series are available for download on iTunes. The PlayStation 2 version of the video game Cartoon Network Racing contains the episodes "Robot Randy" and "The Magic Tree of Nowhere" as unlockable extras.

As of January 1, 2021, all 52 episodes (seasons 1–4) of the series are available to stream on HBO Max.

Video games 
Though the series has no official video games, characters from Courage the Cowardly Dog appear in the Cartoon Network games Cartoon Network: Block Party, Cartoon Network Racing, Cartoon Network Speedway, and Cartoon Network Universe: FusionFall.

Possible revivals
In February 2012, BuzzFeed reported that a CGI special of Courage the Cowardly Dog was in development. The special, titled "The Fog of Courage", aired in 2014.

In October 2018, Dilworth commented on a Facebook post that he was in negotiations with Boomerang for a prequel to the series under the working title Before Courage. However, in May 2020, when asked about the project, Dilworth responded that it had been "transformed into another thing". In June 2021, Dilworth revealed that the project was on turnaround as Cartoon Network's management is prioritizing their focus on other projects. However, in January 2022, Dilworth revealed that the project has already been dropped and fell through for the same reason.

Crossover film 
On June 22, 2021, Warner Bros. Animation announced an animated direct-to-video crossover film with Scooby-Doo called Straight Outta Nowhere: Scooby-Doo! Meets Courage the Cowardly Dog. The film follows Scooby-Doo and his friends finding a suspicious object in Nowhere, Kansas where Courage and his owners reside.

Marty Grabstein and Thea White reprise their roles as Courage and Muriel, while Eustace is voiced by Jeff Bergman due to the deaths of the character's former voice casts Lionel Wilson and Arthur Anderson in 2003 and 2016, respectively. The film was released on DVD and digital on September 14, 2021. The film also serves as a posthumous role for Thea White, who died in July 2021, around two months before the film's release date. Series creator John R. Dilworth did not have any involvement in the crossover. According to animator and artist Tracy Mark Lee, the film's original premise was originally pitched as an episode of Scooby-Doo and Guess Who?.

References

External links 

 Courage the Cowardly Dog—Cartoon Network Department of Cartoons (Archive)
 
 
 

 
1990s American animated television series
1990s American horror comedy television series
1999 American television series debuts
2000s American animated television series
2000s American horror comedy television series
2002 American television series endings
American children's animated comedy television series
American children's animated fantasy television series
American children's animated horror television series
Animated television series about dogs
Annie Award winners
Cartoon Cartoons
Cartoon Network original programming
English-language television shows
Television characters introduced in 1996
Television shows set in Kansas